Men's Super G World Cup 1990/1991

Calendar

Final point standings

In Men's Super G World Cup 1990/91 all three results count.

Men's Super G Team Results

bold indicate highest score - italics indicate race wins

References

World Cup
FIS Alpine Ski World Cup men's Super-G discipline titles